Anne-Marie Périer-Sardou ( Périer, commonly known as Anne-Marie Périer; born 5 April 1945) is a French journalist. She is the daughter of Jacqueline Porel and François Périer.

Biography 
Anne-Marie Périer is the sister of Jean-Pierre Périer, who died in 1966, and the half-sister of Jean-Marie Périer and Marc Porel (died in 1983). José Artur was her tutor. She has 2 sons with Claude Barrois: Paul and Mathias, as well as 2 grandsons, Antoine and Abel.

She is most well known for having been the editor-in-chief of the magazine Mademoiselle Âge Tendre, but mostly for Elle. Franka Berger, sister of Michel Berger, replaced her position under a pseudonym, at her request, at Europe 1, for a fashion segment.

She helped arrange for 2 actresses to appear on the cover of Elle: Sandrine Kiberlain and Emmanuelle Béart.

Périer married Michel Sardou on 11 October 1999, in Neuilly-sur-Seine.

Publications

References 

1945 births
Living people
French journalists